Equal Suffrage League was a suffrage organization founded by Sarah J. Garnet in Brooklyn, New York, in the late 1880s to advocate for voting rights for African American women. Dr. Susan Smith McKinney Steward was a contributor to the founding of the organization. The group worked to abolish both gender and race bias. 

After Garnet became the Superintendent of the Suffrage Department for the National Association of Colored Women (NACW), the Equal Suffrage League affiliated with the National Association of Colored Women. The small organization initially met in Garnet's seamstress shop. In 1907 the Equal Suffrage League and National Association of Colored Women jointly supported a resolution supporting the principles of the Niagara Movement that advocated for equal rights for all American citizens.  

The organization was short-lived, ending when Garnet died in 1911.

References

1880s establishments in New York (state)
1880s in New York City
1911 disestablishments in New York (state)
1911 in New York City
19th century in Brooklyn
20th century in Brooklyn
Women's clubs in the United States
African-American history in New York City
History of women in New York City
Feminism in New York City
New York (state) suffrage